The Friedrichshafen FF.64 was a German two-seat biplane floatplane of the 1910s produced by Flugzeugbau Friedrichshafen.

Development and design
The FF.64 was a two-seat biplane powered by a Mercedes D.III inline piston engine. The aircraft had folding wings as they were intended for operation from Navy ships on patrol/reconnaissance duties. Only three aircraft were built.

Specifications (FF.64)

See also

References

Bibliography

Further reading

1910s German military reconnaissance aircraft
Floatplanes
Biplanes
Single-engined tractor aircraft
FF.64
Aircraft first flown in 1918